Warren station may refer to:

Warren station (Erie Railroad), a former railroad station in Warren, Ohio
Warren station (Pennsylvania Railroad), a former railroad station in Warren, Pennsylvania
Warren Avenue station, a QLINE light rail station in Detroit, Michigan
Warren railway station, former railway station in Wirral, England
Warren station (Illinois), a former railroad station in Warren, Illinois

See also
Warren (disambiguation)
Warren Street station (disambiguation)